Secretary of Tourism may refer to:

Secretary of Tourism (Dominican Republic); see Cabinet of the Dominican Republic
Secretary of Tourism (Mexico)
Secretary of Tourism (Philippines)

See also
Tourism minister